Kabaka is a village in the  Dakshina Kannada district of the state of Karnataka, India. It is near to town of Puttur. Historical Hill NinniKallu Jack hill is situated near Kabaka and Kabaka-Puttur is a railway station on the Mangalore-Hassan Railway line.

External links
 South Canara Gazetteer 1894,1938,1973

Villages in Dakshina Kannada district